The Violin Concerto, Op. 32, is a three-movement concertante composition for violin and orchestra written from 1940 to 1943 by the Finnish composer Uuno Klami. The piece premiered on 29 October 1943 in Helsinki, Finland, with Toivo Haapanen conducting the Helsinki Philharmonic Orchestra; the soloist was the Finnish violinist Anja Ignatius. However, in 1944, the autograph manuscript was lost when Ignatius played the concerto in Stockholm. Klami rewrote the piece from 1953 to 1954: this new version he based on the old, albeit with substantial alterations to each of the three movements. On 9 April 1954, Ignatius, Haapanen, and the Helsinki Philharmonic Orchestra premiered the revised concerto. 

Although the original score was eventually found in the archives of the Swedish Broadcasting Corporation in 1957, the 1954 version had already by then become established in the repertoire. According to Heikki Poroila, the two versions are so different from each other that they "should be treated as independent works".

Structure
The Violin Concerto is in three movements. They are as follows:

Recordings
The sortable table below lists commercially available recordings of the Violin Concerto:

Notes, references, and sources

 
 

Compositions by Uuno Klami
20th-century classical music
1943 compositions
1954 compositions
Klami